Mohamed Airam Ramos Wade (born 13 April 2000) is a Spanish professional footballer who plays for Las Palmas B, as a goalkeeper.

Early and personal life
Ramos was born in Santa Cruz de Tenerife. He is of Senegalese origin.

Club career
Ramos spent his early career with Longuera and Tenerife before joining Real Madrid in 2014. In July 2019 he signed on loan for English club Birmingham City. He left Birmingham City at the end of the 2019–20 season, after the expiry of his loan.

In September 2020 he moved on loan to Real Unión.

In July 2021 he left Real Madrid. In August 2021 he signed for Racing de Santander, playing for their reserve team Rayo Cantabria. He moved to Real Avilés in January 2022. On 16 July he moved to Las Palmas B.

International career
Ramos was in the preliminary Spain squad for the 2017 FIFA U-17 World Cup but was dropped due to disciplinary reasons.

References

2000 births
Living people
Spanish people of Senegalese descent
Spanish sportspeople of African descent
Spanish footballers
Association football goalkeepers
CD Tenerife players
Real Madrid CF players
Real Madrid Castilla footballers
Birmingham City F.C. players
Real Unión footballers
Rayo Cantabria players
Real Avilés CF footballers
UD Las Palmas Atlético players
Segunda División B players
Spanish expatriate footballers
Spanish expatriates in England
Expatriate footballers in England